Love Child is a 2011 Dominican Republic romantic drama film written and directed by Leticia Tonos. The film was selected as the Dominican Republic entry for the Best Foreign Language Film at the 84th Academy Awards, but it did not make the final shortlist.

Cast
 Julietta Rodriguez as Maria
 Victor Checo as Joaquin
 Andres Ramos as Justiniano
 Gastner Legerme as Polo Montifa
 Dionis Rufino as Melido
 Kalent Zaiz as Juana
 Frank Perozo as Rubi
 Héctor Sierra as Papito

See also
 List of submissions to the 84th Academy Awards for Best Foreign Language Film
 List of Dominican submissions for the Academy Award for Best Foreign Language Film

References

External links
 

2011 films
2011 romantic drama films
Dominican Republic romantic drama films
2010s Spanish-language films